Marian Boykan Pour-El (April 29, 1928 – June 10, 2009) was an American mathematical logician who did pioneering work in computable analysis.

Early life and education
Marian Boykan was born in 1928 in New York City; her parents were dentist Joseph Boykan and his wife Matilda (Mattie, née Caspe), a former laboratory technician and housewife.
As a young girl, she performed ballet at the Metropolitan Opera House,
and this influenced her later life where she was often more comfortable speaking before large audiences than in small groups.
Although she wanted to attend the Bronx High School of Science, it was at that time only for boys; instead, she went to a girls' school, Hunter College High School.

Her parents were unwilling to pay the tuition for private college for her, so she went to Hunter College, an inexpensive local higher-education establishment primarily aimed at training schoolteachers. There she earned a bachelor's degree in physics in 1949. She also completed enough courses in mathematics for a second major but was not allowed to have two majors by Hunter College's rules.

She was accepted to Harvard University for graduate studies in mathematics, with full support, as the only woman in the program.
At Harvard, she earned a master's degree in 1951 and a Ph.D. in mathematical logic in 1958. She was very isolated and lonely at Harvard, with few friends and, initially, no other students even willing to sit next to her in her classes. The nearest restroom to her classes was in a different building, and one of the few buildings with air conditioning in the summers was off-limits to women, even when she was assigned as an instructor to a class in that building. Because there were no logicians at Harvard at that time, she spent five years of her time as a visiting student at the University of California, Berkeley. Her doctoral dissertation was Computable Functions.

Career
After finishing her doctorate, Pour-El joined the mathematics faculty at Pennsylvania State University. She earned her tenure there in 1962. During a sabbatical from 1962 to 1964 at the Institute for Advanced Study, she worked with Kurt Gödel.

She moved in 1964 to the University of Minnesota, and was promoted to full professor there in 1968. Except for a year from 1969 to 1970 as a visiting professor at the University of Bristol, she remained at the University of Minnesota until her retirement in 2000.
At Minnesota, her doctoral students included Jill Zimmerman (Ph.D. 1990), later the James M. Beall Professor of Mathematics and Computer Science at Goucher College, Maryland.

Contributions
Pour-El's early work concerned recursion theory, and included joint work with William Alvin Howard, Saul Kripke, Donald A. Martin, and Hilary Putnam.
In a 1974 publication, she studied analogues of computability for analog computers. She proved that, for her formulation of this problem, the functions that can be computed by such computers are the same as the functions that define solutions to algebraic differential equations. This result, a refinement of the work of Claude Shannon,
became known as the Shannon–Pour-El thesis.

In the late 1970s Pour-El began working on computable analysis.
Her "most famous and surprising result", co-authored with Minnesota colleague J. Ian Richards, was that for certain computable initial conditions, determining the behavior of the wave equation is an undecidable problem. Their result was later taken up by Roger Penrose in his book The Emperor's New Mind; Penrose used this result as a test case for the Church–Turing thesis, but concluded that the non-smoothness of the initial conditions makes it implausible that a computational device could use this phenomenon to exceed the limits of conventional computing. Freeman Dyson used the same result to argue for the evolutionary superiority of analog to digital forms of life.

With Richards, Pour-El was the author of a book, Computability in Analysis and Physics.

Recognition
Pour-El was elected to the Hunter College Hall of Fame in 1975, and as a Fellow of the American Association for the Advancement of Science in 1983.
A symposium was held in honor of Pour-El in Japan in 1993.

Personal life
As a student at Berkeley, Pour-El met her husband, Israeli biochemist Akiva Pour-El. They had one daughter, Ina. Her husband followed her to Penn State after completing his doctorate a year later, and he later followed her, again, when she moved to Minnesota. They lived separately for several long intervals, most notably from 1969 to 1975 when her husband taught in Illinois, and Pour-El wrote an article in 1981 on how having a long-distance relationship worked for her.

Pour-El's brother is music composer Martin Boykan.

Selected publications

References

1928 births
2009 deaths
20th-century American mathematicians
American women mathematicians
Mathematical logicians
Women logicians
Hunter College alumni
Harvard University alumni
Pennsylvania State University faculty
Fellows of the American Association for the Advancement of Science
People from New York City
20th-century American women
21st-century American women